Trouvé is a French surname. Notable people with the surname include:

Gustave Trouvé (1839–1902), French electrical engineer and inventor
Rudy Trouvé (born 1967), Belgian musician
Tatiana Trouvé (born 1968), French artist

French-language surnames